Peace Like a River is a studio album released by the Mormon Tabernacle Choir and Orchestra at Temple Square. The album was released in 2004.

Track listing
Sweet Peace
Music: English Folk Song
Text: David Warner
Arrangement: Mack Wilberg
2:31
Be Still, My Soul
Music: Jean Sibelius
Text: Katharina von Schlegel (trans. Jane Borthwick)
Arrangement: Mack Wilberg
4:52
Peace Like a River
Music: African-American Spiritual
Arrangement: Mack Wilberg
4:31
All Things Bright and Beautiful
Music: John Rutter
Text: Mrs. C. F. Alexander
2:45
The Lord Is My Shepherd
Music: Thomas Koschat
Text: James Montgomery
Arrangement: Mack Wilberg
4:33
This Is My Father's World
Music: Trad. English Melody (adapt. Franklin L. Sheppard)
Text: Maltbie D. Babcock
Arrangement: Mack Wilberg
3:24
Wayfarin' Stranger
Music: American Folk Hymn
Arrangement: Mack Wilberg
4:12
Lord, Make Me an Instrument of Thy Peace
Music: John Rutter
Text: St. Francis of Assisi
3:04
Swing Low, Sweet Chariot
Music: African-American Spiritual
Arrangement: Alice Parker and Robert Shaw
3:25
Deep River
Music: American Folk Hymn
Arrangement: Mack Wilberg
4:10
The Lamb
Music: John Tavener
Text: William Blake
3:43
A Child's Prayer
Music: Janice Kapp Perry
Text: Janice Kapp Perry
Orchestration: Barlow Bradford
3:55
It Is Well with My Soul
Music: Philip B. Bliss
Text: Horatio Gates Spafford
Arrangement: Michael Davis
Additional Lyrics: Michael Davis
5:06
Count Your Blessings (Instead of Sheep)
Music: Irving Berlin
Text: Irving Berlin
Arrangement: Michael Davis
3:55
A Gaelic Blessing
Music: John Rutter
Text: Adapted from an old Gaelic rune
2:04
[[Thou Gracious God, Whose Mercy Lends
Music: English Folk Tune
Text: Oliver Wendell Holmes, Sr.]]
Arrangement: Mack Wilberg
5:01
Come, Let Us Anew
Music: attributed to James Lucas
Text: Charles Wesley
Arrangement: Mack Wilberg
5:07

Charts

References

External links
 Tabernacle Choir's Official Website album link

2004 albums
Religious music albums
Tabernacle Choir albums